A CN star has unusually strong cyanogen bands in its spectrum compared to other stars of its stellar class. This group of stars was first noticed in certain G and K-type giants by J. J. Nassau and W. W. Morgan in 1949, then a further 4,150 were identified by Nancy G. Roman in 1952. They can be distinguished from barium stars by the lack of s-process elements, and from other types of luminous stars by the general weakness of features other than the CN lines.

The excess strength of the CN bands is classified by a positive index with increments of 0.5. A value of zero indicates a normal star and is not listed in the stellar class, while the peak value of 4 is essentially similar to a carbon star. Stars classified in the MK system with a CN suffix are considered "strong" CN stars. A value of 0.5 is also termed a marginal CN star, which corresponds to the typical giant stars in the Hyades cluster.

References